Himantolophus groenlandicus, the Atlantic footballfish or Atlantic football-fish, is an anglerfish found primarily in mesopelagic depths of the ocean. Despite its name, this species might not be restricted to the Atlantic Ocean, with its range possibly extending into the Indian Ocean and to the Pacific Ocean. It is found in tropical and temperate regions.

Description
Males are much smaller, only . The female's extremely rotund body is studded with bony plates, each bearing a central spine. The modified ray on the head makes a thick "fishing-rod", tipped with a lure on a central luminous bulb. It uses this to attract smaller fish in the dark abyss. Despite the male's tiny size, it is not parasitic, unlike the males of many other anglerfish.

Relationship with humans
Due to being found in the deep water, few human sightings have occurred. Despite its fearsome appearance, it poses no actual danger. It is of little food value.

Predators
Several specimens have been reported from the stomachs of sperm whales caught in the Azores.

References

Longmann's Animal Encyclopedia

Himantolophidae
Deep sea fish
Fish of the Atlantic Ocean
Taxa named by Johan Reinhardt
Fish described in 1837